Yiğitcan Gölboyu (born 12 May 1992) is a Turkish professional footballer who plays as a defender.

External links
 
 

1992 births
Footballers from İzmir
Living people
Turkish footballers
Association football defenders
Altay S.K. footballers
Aydınspor footballers
Çorumspor footballers
Adanaspor footballers
Gümüşhanespor footballers
TFF First League players
TFF Second League players
TFF Third League players